Kopere Solar Power Station, is a planned  solar power plant in Kenya, the largest economy in the East African Community.

Location

Overview
Kenya has ambitions to electrify 100 percent of the country's population, up from 70 percent in 2017. This development and the 55 megawatts Garissa Solar Power Station, owned by Kenya Rural Electrification Authority, are aimed to diversify Kenya electricity sources, given the unpredictability of hydro-power in this East African country. The project was initiated by Portuguese energy firm  Martifer Solar and was later acquired by the French firm in 2016.

This power station is expected to supply at least 600,000 on-grid customers.

Developers
The power station is being developed by Voltalia Portugal SA, the Portuguese subsidiary of the French company Voltalia. The developers have already signed a 20-year power purchase agreement with electricity distributor Kenya Power and Lighting Company. Voltalia is expected to own and operate the solar farm and power station, after commissioning.

Construction timeline, costs and funding
Construction is expected to start in 2019. In December 2018, the African Development Bank (AfDB) committed to lend US$18.17 million towards the construction of this power station. At that time, AfDB was also in the process of securing another US$11.6 million concessional loan from the Climate Investment Fund’s Scaling-up Renewable Energy Program (SREP), to lend towards this development as well.

See also
List of power stations in Kenya
Garissa Solar Power Station

References

External links
 Voltalia signs power sale contract for 50 MW solar power plant in Kenya As of 30 May 2018.

Solar power stations in Kenya
Nandi County
Proposed solar power stations in Kenya